After a year of absence, Sweden competed in the Eurovision Song Contest 1965 with the opera singer Ingvar Wixell, and the song "Absent Friend" (originally "Annorstädes vals") composed by Dag Wirén. For the first time, one singer sang all the songs in the national final, and Ingvar was also the first male singer to represent Sweden. It was the first ESC entry that was not performed in the country's native language; this led to the introduction of a language restriction the following year.
The contest was held in Naples that year, and Sweden finished 10th out of 18.*

Before Eurovision

Melodifestivalen 1965 
Melodifestivalen 1965 (known as the Svensk sångfinal) was the selection for the seventh song to represent Sweden at the Eurovision Song Contest, held at the Cirkus in Stockholm on 13 February 1965. It was the sixth time that this system of picking a song had been used. Ingvar Wixell performed all of the songs. Eight songs were submitted to Sveriges Radio for the competition, of which two were turned down by Wixell. Regional juries selected the winning song. The final was held in the Cirkus in Stockholm on 13 February 1965, hosted by Birgitta Sandstedt and was broadcast on Sveriges Radio TV but was not broadcast on radio.

At Eurovision 
On the night of the final Wixell performed 10th in the running order, following Monaco and preceding France. Sweden gained 6 points and ranked 10th. The Swedish jury awarded its 5 points to Denmark, who had arguably the most old-fashioned song of the night.

Voting

References

External links
ESCSweden.com (in Swedish)
Information site about Melodifestivalen
Eurovision Song Contest National Finals

1965
Countries in the Eurovision Song Contest 1965
1965
Eurovision
Eurovision